The 14609/10 –Sri Mata Vaishno Devi Katra Hemkunt Express is an Express train belonging to Indian Railways – Northern Railways zone that runs between Rishikesh and Sri Mata Vaishno Devi Katra in India.

It operates as train number 14609 from Rishikesh to Shri Mata Vaisno Devi Katra and as train number 14610 in the reverse direction.

It is named after the Hemkunt Sahib, a holy place in the Sikh religion.

Coaches

The Hemkunt Express presently has 2 AC 2 tier, 3 AC 3 tier, 10 Sleeper Class, 4 Second Class seating & 2 SLR (Seating cum Luggage Rake) coaches.

As with most train services in India, coach composition may be amended at the discretion of Indian Railways depending on demand.

Service

The 14609/10 Rishikesh  Hemkunt Express covers the distance of 558 kilometres in 12 hours 10 mins as 14609 Rishikesh–Jammu Tawi Hemkunt Express (45.86 km/hr) & in 13 hrs 25 mins as 14610 Jammu Tawi–Rishikesh Hemkunt Express (41.59 km/hr).

Schedule

Both the trains runs daily for both the direction and reach next day to the destination station.

Routeing

Traction

WDP-4D of Tughlkhabad shed hauls the train in entire journey. Railway works to give WAP-7 to the train as soon as possible.

External links

References 

Transport in Katra, Jammu and Kashmir
Named passenger trains of India
Rail transport in Uttarakhand
Rail transport in Uttar Pradesh
Rail transport in Haryana
Rail transport in Jammu and Kashmir
Transport in Rishikesh
Express trains in India